Microsoft Translator is a multilingual machine translation cloud service provided by Microsoft. Microsoft Translator is a part of Microsoft Cognitive Services and integrated across multiple consumer, developer, and enterprise products; including Bing, Microsoft Office, SharePoint, Microsoft Edge, Microsoft Lync, Yammer, Skype Translator, Visual Studio, and Microsoft Translator apps for Windows, Windows Phone, iPhone and Apple Watch, and Android phone and Android Wear.

Microsoft Translator also offers text and speech translation through cloud services for businesses. Service for text translation via the Translator Text API ranges from a free tier supporting two million characters per month to paid tiers supporting billions of characters per month. Speech translation via Microsoft Speech services is offered based on time of the audio stream.

The service supports text translation between many languages and language varieties. It also supports several speech translation systems that currently power the Microsoft Translator live conversation feature, Skype Translator, and Skype for Windows Desktop, and the Microsoft Translator Apps for iOS and Android.

Development

History 
The first version of Microsoft's machine translation system was developed between 1999 and 2000 within Microsoft Research. This system was based on semantic predicate-argument structures known as logical forms (LF) and was spun from the grammar correction feature developed for Microsoft Word. This system was eventually used to translate the entire Microsoft Knowledge Base into Spanish, French, German, and Japanese.

Microsoft's approach to machine translation, like most modern machine translation systems, is "data driven": rather than relying on writing explicit rules to translate natural language, algorithms are trained to understand and interpret translated parallel texts, allowing them to automatically learn how to translate new natural language text. Microsoft's experience with the LF system led directly to a treelet translation system that simplified the LF to dependency trees and eventually to an order template model, significantly improving in speed and enabling the incorporation of new target languages.

The consumer-facing translation site known as Bing Translator (previously known as Windows Live translator) was launched in 2007 and provides free text and website translations on the web. Text is translated directly within the Bing Translator webpage while websites are translated through the Bilingual Viewer tools.

In 2011, the service was extended to include numerous Microsoft Translator products through a cloud-based application programming interface, which supports products available to both consumer and enterprise users. An additional speech translation capability was introduced in March 2016.

In May 2018, an update to the API was introduced. This new version offered neural machine translation as the default method of translating. In addition to translation, the new version features transliteration and a bilingual dictionary to look up words to find alternative translations and to view examples in sentences.

Speech translation was integrated into Microsoft Speech services in September 2018, providing end-to-end speech, speech-to-text, and text-to-speech translation.

Translation methodology and research 
Microsoft Translator uses machine translation to create instantaneous translations from one natural language to another. This system is based on four distinct areas of computer learning research seen below.

Accuracy 
The quality of Microsoft Translator’s machine translation outputs are evaluated using a method called the BLEU score.

BLEU (Bilingual Evaluation Understudy) is an algorithm for evaluating the quality of text which has been machine-translated from one natural language to another. Quality is considered to be the correspondence between a machine's output and that of a human. BLEU was one of the first metrics to achieve a high correlation with human judgments of quality, and remains one of the most popular automated and inexpensive metrics.

Because machine translation is based on statistical algorithms rather than human translators, the automatic translations it produces are not always entirely accurate. Microsoft Translator has introduced various feedback features, such as the Collaborative Translation Framework, into its products to allow users to suggest alternative translations. These alternative translations are then integrated into the Microsoft Translator algorithms to improve future translations.

In November 2016, Microsoft Translator introduced translation using deep neural networks in nine of its highest traffic languages, including all of its speech languages and Japanese. Neural networks provide better translation than industry standard statistical machine learning.

Core products 
Microsoft Translator is a cloud-based API that is integrated into numerous Microsoft products and services. The Translator API can be used on its own and can be customized for use in a pre-publishing or post-publishing environment. The API, which is available through subscription, is free for lower translation volumes, and is charged according to a tiered payment system for volumes exceeding two million characters per month. The remaining core products are available for free.

Microsoft Translator cloud translation 
The Microsoft Translator is a cloud-based automatic translation service that can be used to build applications, websites, and tools requiring multi-language support.
Text translation: The Microsoft Translator Text API can be used to translate text into any of the languages supported by the service.
Speech translation: Microsoft Translator is integrated into Microsoft Speech services which is an end-to-end REST based API that can be used to build applications, tools, or any solution requiring multi-languages speech translation. Speech to speech translation is available to or from any of the conversation languages, and speech to text translation is available from the conversation languages into any of the Microsoft Translator-supported language systems.

Custom Translator 
Custom Translator is a feature of the Microsoft Translator services that allows enterprises, app developers, and language service providers to build neural translation systems that understand the terminology used in their own business and industry. The customized translations can then be delivered into existing applications, workflows and websites using a normal call to the Microsoft Translator API. Custom Translator can be used when translating text with the Microsoft Translator Text API and when translating speech with Microsoft Speech services.

Live feature 
A personal universal translator that enables up to 500 people to have live, multi-device, multi-language, in person translated conversations. This feature is currently free and available in the Microsoft Translator apps (Android, iOS or Windows) and from the browser at:

Microsoft Translator Hub 
The Microsoft Translator Hub allows enterprises and language service providers to build their own translation systems that understand business- and industry-specific terminology. The Hub can also be used in conjunction with the CTF, allowing administrators to approve CTF results and add them directly to the Hub. The Microsoft Translator Hub is only available for statistical machine translation and cannot be used with the newest version of the Microsoft Translator API.

The Hub has also been used for language preservation, allowing communities to create their own language translation systems for language and cultural preservation. The Hub has been used to create translation systems for languages such as Hmong, Mayan, Nepali, and Welsh.

Multilingual App Toolkit (MAT) 
The Multilingual App Toolkit (MAT) is an integrated Visual Studio tool, which allows developers to streamline localization workflows of their Windows, Windows Phone and desktop apps. MAT improves localization of file management, translation support, and editing tools.

Microsoft Translator web app 

Microsoft Translator (previously Live Search Translator, Windows Live Translator, and Bing Translator) is a user facing translation portal provided by Microsoft as part of its Bing services to translate texts or entire web pages into different languages. All translation pairs are powered by the Microsoft Translator, a Neural machine translation platform and web service, developed by Microsoft Research, as its backend translation software. Two transliteration pairs (between Chinese (Simplified) and Chinese (Traditional)) are provided by Microsoft's Windows International team.

Bing Translator can translate phrases entered by the user or acquire a link to a web page and translate it entirely. When translating an entire web page, or when the user selects "Translate this page" in Bing search results, the Bilingual Viewer is shown, which allows users to browse the original web page text and translation in parallel, supported by synchronized highlights, scrolling, and navigation. Four Bilingual Viewer layouts are available:
Side by side
Top and bottom
Original with hover translation
Translation with hover original

Bing Translator integrates with several other Microsoft products. The following is a table of products into which Bing Translator is integrated or may be integrated:

Supported products 
Through its core product offerings, Microsoft Translator supports the translation features of many Microsoft products at the consumer and enterprise levels. These products fall broadly into three categories — communication products, Microsoft Office, and apps.

Communication 
Lync
SharePoint
Yammer
Skype Translator

Microsoft Office 
Excel
OneNote
Outlook
PowerPoint
Publisher
Visio
Word
Word Online

Apps 
Web app (translator.microsoft.com)
Windows and Windows 10
Windows Phone
iPhone and Apple Watch
Android phone and Android Wear
Kindle Fire
Skype Translator
Microsoft Edge
Microsoft SwiftKey

Deprecated products

Collaborative Translation Framework (CTF) 
The Collaborative Translation Framework (CTF) is an extension of the Microsoft Translator API that allows post-publishing improvement of translated text. By using the CTF, readers have the ability to suggest alternative translations to those provided by the API, or vote on previously offered alternatives. This information is then delivered to the API to improve future translations.

Translator Web Widget 
The Translator Web Widget is a translation tool that can be added to web pages by pasting a predefined snippet of JavaScript code into the page. The web widget is offered for free by Microsoft, and supports both pre-publishing customized translations using the Translator Hub, and post-publishing improvements using the Collaborative Translation Framework.

Supported languages 
, Microsoft Translator supports 124 languages and language varieties. The list of supported languages is available at the Microsoft Translator website and can also be retrieved programmatically through the cloud services.

Afrikaans
Albanian
Amharic
Arabic
Armenian
Assamese
Azerbaijani
Bangla
Bashkir
Basque
Bosnian
Bulgarian
Cantonese (Traditional)
Catalan
Chinese (Literary)
ChiShona
Chinese (Simplified)
Chinese (Traditional)
Croatian
Czech
Danish
Dari
Divehi
Dutch
English
Estonian
Faroese
Fijian
Filipino
Finnish
French
French (Canada)
Galician
Georgian
German
Greek
Gujarati
Haitian Creole
Hausa
Hebrew
Hindi
Hmong Daw
Hungarian
Icelandic
Igbo
Indonesian
Inuinnaqtun
Inuktitut
Inuktitut (Latin)
Irish
Italian
Japanese
Kannada
Kazakh
Khmer
Kinyarwanda
Klingon (Latin)
Klingon (plqaD)
Korean
Kurdish (Central)
Kurdish (Northern)
Kyrgyz
Lao
Latvian
Lingala
Lithuanian
Luganda
Macedonian
Malagasy
Malay
Malayalam
Maltese
Marathi
Mongolian (Cyrillic)
Mongolian (Traditional)
Myanmar (Burmese)
Māori
Nepali
Norwegian
Nyanja
Odia
Pashto
Persian
Polish
Portuguese (Brazil)
Portuguese (Portugal)
Punjabi (Gurmukhi)
Querétaro Otomi
Romanian
Rundi (Kirundi)
Russian
Samoan
Serbian (Cyrillic)
Serbian (Latin)
Sesotho
Sesotho sa Leboa
Setswana
Slovak
Slovenian
Somali
Spanish
Swahili
Swedish
Tahitian
Tamil
Tatar
Telugu
Thai
Tibetan
Tigrinya
Tongan
Turkish
Turkmen
Ukrainian
Upper Sorbian
Urdu
Uyghur
Uzbek (Latin)
Vietnamese
Welsh
Xhosa
Yoruba
Yucatec Maya
Zulu

Community partners 
Microsoft Translator has engaged with community partners to increase the number of languages and to improve overall language translation quality. Below is a list of community partners that Microsoft Translator has teamed with.
CNGL Centre for Global Intelligent Content
Hmong Language Partners - Hmong Daw
Jawaharlal Nehru University - Urdu
Senedd Cymru (the Welsh Parliament, partnered as the National Assembly for Wales) - Welsh
Tilde - Estonian, Latvian, Lithuanian
Translators Without Borders - Swahili
Appen - Filipino (Tagalog), Malagasy, Samoan, Tahitian, Tongan
Government of Nunavut - Inuktitut
Auckland University of Technology - Māori
Waikato University - Māori
Government of the State of Querétaro - Querétaro Otomi
Klingon Language Institute - Klingon

Additionally, Microsoft has teamed with the Klingon Language Institute, which promotes the constructed language, Klingon, which is used within the fictional Star Trek universe produced by Paramount and CBS Studios. Klingon has been supported by Microsoft Translator since May 2013.

See also 

Machine translation
Speech synthesis
Lernout & Hauspie
Babel Fish (discontinued; redirects to main Yahoo! site)
PlainTalk
NeoSpeech
Loquendo
Nuance Communications
Microsoft text-to-speech voices
Google Translate

References

External links 

 (copyright of Microsoft)

SW development 

Machine translation software
Natural language processing software
Translation websites
Universal Windows Platform apps
IOS software
WatchOS software
Android (operating system) software
Wear OS software
Microsoft websites
Microsoft software
Microsoft Edge extensions
Internet Explorer add-ons
Microsoft Bing